Adam Coleman Howard is an American actor, screenwriter and film director. He is the son of advice columnist Margo Howard, the grandson of advice columnist Ann Landers and the stepson of actor Ken Howard.

Filmography

Actor
 Quiet Cool (1986, directed by Clay Borris) - Joshua Greer
 Slaves of New York (1989, directed by James Ivory) - Stash
 The Equalizer (TV series) 
 Suicide Squad (1989, directed by Marc Laub) - Willie Halsey (guest star)
 Pacific Palisades (1990, directed by Bernard Schmitt, starring Sophie Marceau) - Ben
 No Secrets (1991, directed by Dezsö Magyar) - Manny
 Ride Me (1994, directed by Bashar Shbib) - Adolpho Frenzy
 Dead Girl (1996, directed by Adam Coleman Howard) - Ari Rose

Writer and director
Dead Girl (1996) - starring Anne Parillaud, Val Kilmer and Seymour Cassel
Dark Harbor (1998) - starring Alan Rickman and Polly Walker

Associate producer
Refuge (2002, directed by Narain Jashanmal)

References

External links

American male film actors
American film directors
American male television actors
American male screenwriters
Year of birth missing (living people)
Living people
Place of birth missing (living people)